Cristóbal Salvó Saura, also known as Salvó I (1895 - 17 August 1927), was a Spanish footballer who played as a midfielder for FC Espanya and RCD Espanyol. He was one of the most prominent Catalan footballers of the 1910s, being considered the best half-winger of his time. His brother Pantaleón also played for FC Espanya.

Club career
Born in Catalonia, he began his career at his hometown club FC Espanya in the late-1900s, playing with them for nearly a decade. He was one of the most important players in the team's rise to become a powerhouse in Catalonia, competing head-to-head against the likes of Barcelona and Espanyol, being crucial in helping the club win three Catalan championships (1912–13, 1913–14 and 1916–17), the 1914 Pyrenees Cup and he also was pivotal in helping Espanya reach the 1914 Copa del Rey Final, which still is the club's only Copa del Rey final appearance, but they lost 1–2 to Athletic Bilbao, courtesy of a brace from Severino Zuazo. In the semi-finals of the 1914 Pyrenees Cup, Espanya defeated Barcelona with a resounding 5–2 win at the Camp de la Indústria, which prompted a pitch invasion where serious incidents happened including Cristóbal being attacked by Pere Molins, who gave him a punch that left him unconscious.

After leaving Espanya he had spells in RCD Espanyol and FC Internacional before ending his career. He died in 1927, aged just 32.

International career
Like many other FC Espanya players of that time, Salvó played several matches for the Catalonia national team, being a member of the Catalan side that won the 1916 Prince of Asturias Cup, an inter-regional competition organized by the RFEF. At the tournament he teamed up with Emilio Sampere in the midfield. Salvó also participated in the following edition in 1917, in which Catalonia finished as runner-up to Madrid.

Honours

Club
FC Espanya
Catalan championship:
Champions (3): 1912–13, 1913–14 and 1916–17

Copa del Rey:
Runner-up (1): 1914

Pyrenees Cup:
Champions (1): 1914

International
Catalonia
Prince of Asturias Cup:
Champions (1): 1916
Runner-up (1): 1917

References

1895 births
1927 deaths
Spanish footballers
Association football midfielders
Footballers from Catalonia
RCD Espanyol footballers